The Via della Vittoria was a military road between Bardia in Italian Libya and Sidi Barrani in western Egypt.

Characteristics 

The "Via della Vittoria" (Victory Road), was built by Italian engineers during World War II, between September and December 1940. The road went from Sidi Barrani, Egypt, to the border of Italian Libya and connected to the Via Balbia.

It was officially called Via della Vittoria nell'Africa Settentrionale Italiana in order to distinguish it from another "Via della Vittoria" built in 1939 in Ethiopia/Africa Orientale Italiana.

History 

The Italian Army invaded Egypt in summer 1940 and penetrated until Sidi Barrani. The need of communication in order to supply the Army forced the construction of this new road.

In fall 1940 Italian Marshal Rodolfo Graziani ordered his Army in western Egypt to complete this new coastal road extending the Via Balbia  inside Egypt, even in order to create an infrastructure for a planned Italian invasion of the Nile Delta in January/February 1941.

In December 1940 the new road was used by the British forces during Operation Compass. In the next two years the road was damaged by the continuous changes in the front between Axis forces under Erwin Rommel and the Allies.

See also 
 North African campaign

Footnotes

References

 

Roads in Egypt
Roads in Libya
Italian fascist architecture
Libya in World War II
Italian Cyrenaica
Western Desert campaign